Orontium aquaticum , sometimes called golden-club, floating arum, never-wets or tawkin, is a species of flowering plants in the family Araceae.  It is the single living species in the genus Orontium, which also contains several extinct species described from fossils.   O. aquaticum is endemic to the eastern United States and is found growing in ponds, streams, and shallow lakes. It prefers an acidic environment. The leaves are pointed and oval with a water repellent surface. The inflorescence is most notable for having an extremely small almost indistinguishable sheath surrounding the spadix. Very early in the flowering this green sheath withers away leaving only the spadix. 

The sheath was originally classified by Adolf Engler as a spathe due it being the last foliar piece before the spadix. He also noted that species lacked a sympodial leaf. However, in a 1988 paper Thomas Ray argued that the structure was misidentified by Engler and was actually a sympodial leaf. According to Ray the spathe was missing and not the sympodial leaf. This interpretation was determined based on observations of morphological charactestics namely the appearance of a two-keeled bracteole and its positioning. Despite this, the floral structure is still commonly identified in the literature as being a spathe.

References

Bibliography
Bown, Deni (2000). Aroids: Plants of the Arum Family [ILLUSTRATED]. Timber Press. 

Orontioideae
Flora of the United States
Plants described in 1753
Taxa named by Carl Linnaeus